This article lists Russian river passenger ships operated in the Soviet Union and modern Russia.

Long voyage river passenger ships

Motorships
Amur class motorship (project 386/Q-003), 2-deck
Anton Chekhov class motorship (project Q-056), 4-deck
Borodino class motorship (pre-Soviet project), 2-deck 
Baykal class motorship (project 646), 2-deck 
Dunay class motorship (project 305), 2-deck 
Dmitriy Furmanov class motorship (project 302), 4-deck 
Ivan Kalita class motorship (project 331), 1-deck 
Lenin class motorship (project 20), 3-deck 
Maksim Gorkiy class motorship (project Q-040), 4-deck 
Oktyabrskaya Revolyutsiya class motorship (project 26–37), 3-deck 
Otdykh class motorship (project R-80), 3-deck, catamarane  
Rodina class motorship (project 588), 3-deck
Rossiya class motorship (project 785), 2-deck 
Rossiya class motorship (project 1877), 2-deck
Sergey Yesenin class motorship (project Q-065), 3-deck  
Ukraina class motorship (project Q-053), 3-deck 
Valerian Kuybyshev class motorship (project 92-016), 4-deck
Vasiliy Surikov class motorship (project Q-040A), 4-deck 
Vladimir Ilyich class motorship (project 301), 4-deck 
Volga class motorship (project Q-031), 3-deck  
Yerofey Khabarov class motorship (project 860), 2-deck

Steamships
Lev Tolstoy class steamship, 1,5-deck
N. V. Gogol steamship, 2-deck
Ryazan class steamship (project 737), 2-deck

References

!
!